Poravankara Narayanan Nair Sivaji is a Singaporean former footballer and manager.

Career

In 1992, Sivaji was appointed manager of Singapore. In 1996, he was appointed manager of Singaporean side Tanjong Pagar United. In 2004, he was appointed manager technical director of Singapore. In 2008, Sivaji was appointed manager of Lion City Sailors in Singapore.

In 2010, he was appointed manager of Burmese club Hanthawaddy United, helping them win the 2010 General Aung San Shield, their only major trophy. In 2020, he was appointed technical director of Brunei.

References

External links
 

Balestier Khalsa FC head coaches
Expatriate football managers in Brunei
Expatriate football managers in Myanmar
Lion City Sailors FC head coaches
Living people
Singapore national football team managers
Singapore Premier League head coaches
Singaporean expatriate football managers
Singaporean football managers
Singaporean footballers
Singaporean people of Tamil descent
Singaporean sportspeople of Indian descent
Tanjong Pagar United FC head coaches
Young Lions FC head coaches
Year of birth missing (living people)